The 2006 Primera B de Chile was the 56th completed season of the Primera B de Chile. 

Deportes Melipilla was the tournament's champions. The other teams promoted were Ñublense (runner-up under Melipilla in the league's promotion playoffs) and Lota Schwager following beat C.S.D. Rangers in the shootout during the 2006 Primera División de Chile relegation playoffs. That match had to Cristián Limenza as the best, who saved two penalty kicks to Juan Cisternas and Miguel Ayala in the shootout. Nevertheless, on August 27th, 2006, Magallanes lost the category and was relegated to Tercera División de Chile after being defeated 2-0 by Deportivo Temuco.

First phase

Second phase

Promotion playoffs

Relegation playoffs

See also
Chilean football league system

References

External links
 RSSSF 2006

Primera B de Chile seasons
Primera B
Chil